Fencing events were contested at the 1987 Summer Universiade in Zagreb, Yugoslavia.

Medal overview

Men's events

Women's events

Medal table

References
 Universiade fencing medalists on HickokSports

1987 Summer Universiade
Universiade
Fencing at the Summer Universiade
Fencing competitions in Croatia